The 2012 All-Ireland Senior Hurling Championship was the 125th staging of the All-Ireland hurling championship since its establishment by the Gaelic Athletic Association in 1887. The draw for the 2012 fixtures took place on 6 October 2011. The championship began on 19 May 2012 and ended on 30 September 2012.

Kilkenny were the defending champions and successfully retained their title following a 3–22 to 3–11 victory over Galway in a replay of the final.

Teams
A total of fourteen teams contested the championship, including all of the teams from the 2011 championship. There were no new teams entering the championship.

Laois and Westmeath were the first teams to exit the 2011 championship, however, there was no relegation play-off.  Both teams contested the 2012 championship.

Kerry, the winners of the 2011 Christy Ring Cup, declined their automatic right to promotion to the championship. They instead contested the Christy Ring Cup once again.

Team summaries

Stadiums and locations

Personnel and kits

The Championship

Format
The All-Ireland Senior Hurling Championship of 2012 will be run on a provincial basis as usual.  It will be a knockout tournament with pairings drawn at random in the respective provinces – there will be no seeds.

Each match will be played as a single leg. If a match is drawn there will be a replay.  If that match ends in a draw a period of extra time will be played, however, if both sides are still level at the end of extra time another replay will take place.

Leinster Championship

Preliminary Round: (2 matches) These will be two matches between four of the 'weaker' teams from the province.  The two winning teams will advance to the quarter-finals while the two losing teams will enter the All-Ireland qualifiers.

Quarter-finals: (3 matches) The winners of the two preliminary round games will join the other four Leinster teams to make up three quarter-final pairings.  The three winning teams will advance to the semi-finals while the three losing teams will enter the All-Ireland qualifiers.

Semi-finals: (2 matches) The three winners of the quarter-finals will join Kilkenny (who, as reigning provincial champions, will receive a bye to this stage) to make up the semi-final pairings.  The two winning teams will advance to the final while the two losing teams will enter the All-Ireland qualifiers.

Final: (1 match) The winners of the two semi-finals will contest this game.  The winning team will advance to the All-Ireland semi-final while the losing team will advance to the All-Ireland quarter-final.

Munster Championship

Quarter-final: (1 match) This will be a single match between the first two teams drawn from the province of Munster.  The losing team will enter the All-Ireland qualifiers while the winners will advance to the semi-finals.

Semi-finals: (2 matches) The winner of the lone quarter-final will join the other three Munster teams to make up the semi-final pairings.  The two winning teams will advance to the final while the two losing teams will enter the All-Ireland qualifiers.

Final: (1 match) The winners of the two semi-finals will contest this game.  The winning team will advance to the All-Ireland semi-final while the losing team will advance to the All-Ireland quarter-final.

All-Ireland Qualifiers

Preliminary round: (2 matches) These will be two matches between the first four teams drawn from the six teams who lose their provincial preliminary round games and provincial quarter-final games. The two winning teams will advance to phase 1 of the All-Ireland qualifiers while the two losing teams will be eliminated from the championship.

Phase 1: (2 matches) The two winners of the preliminary qualifiers will join the two remaining provincial first round and provincial quarter-final losers to make up the phase 1 pairings.  The two winning teams will advance to phase 3 while the two losing teams will be eliminated from the championship.

Phase 2: (2 matches) These will be two matches between the four teams who lose their provincial semi-final games. The two winning teams will advance to phase 3 of the All-Ireland qualifiers while the two losing teams will be eliminated from the championship.

Phase 3: (2 matches) These will be two matches between the two phase 1 winners and the two phase 2 winners. The two winning teams will advance to the All-Ireland quarter-finals while the two losing teams will be eliminated from the championship.

All-Ireland Championship

Quarter-finals: (2 matches) These will bet two lone matches between the defeated provincial finalists and the two winning teams from phase 3 of the qualifiers.  The two winning teams will advance to the All-Ireland semi-finals while the two losing teams will be eliminated from the championship.

Semi-finals: (2 matches) The two quarter-final winning teams will join the two provincial winning teams to make up the semi-final pairings. The two winning teams will advance to the All-Ireland final while the two losing teams will be eliminated from the championship.

Final: (1 match) The winners of the two semi-finals will contest this game.  The winning team will be declared All-Ireland champions.

Leinster Senior Hurling Championship

Munster Senior Hurling Championship

All-Ireland Qualifiers

Preliminary round

Phase 1

Phase 2

Phase 3

All-Ireland Senior Hurling Championship

Quarter-finals

Semi-finals

Final

Statistics

Scoring
 First goal of the championship: Pa Bourke for Tipperary against Limerick (Munster quarter-final, 27 May 2012)

Top scorers
Overall

Single game

Miscellaneous
 Westmeath's defeat of Antrim in the Leinster preliminary round is their first ever victory over the team in the championship. It is only the second ever meeting of the sides in the championship.
 In the Leinster quarter-final, Offaly defeat Wexford for the first time since 2000.
 For the first time in championship history Waterford qualify for a fourth consecutive Munster final.
 In the Leinster semi-final between Kilkenny and Dublin, Henry Shefflin becomes the first player in championship history to surpass 500 points.
 Limerick's score of 6–21 against Laois in the All-Ireland qualifiers is their highest ever tally in a championship match.  One week later they break this record by scoring 8–26 against Antrim.
 The Munster semi-final meeting of Cork and Tipperary sets a new record as the ninth consecutive year that the sides have met in championship hurling. Previous consecutive meetings stretched from 1949 (draw and replay) to 1954 – a total of seven games in six years. Earlier, eight games were played in the seven-year period 1907 to 1913, however, two of those games were played in the calendar year of 1908.
 In the Leinster final Henry Shefflin becomes Kilkenny's most "capped" player of all-time when he makes his 58th championship appearance. His goal in that game preserves his unique record of being the only player in history to score a goal in fourteen consecutive championship seasons.
 Galway make history by winning the Leinster Championship for the first time.
 Cork and Galway meet in an All-Ireland semi-final for the first time since 1985.
 Tipperary's eighteen point defeat by Kilkenny in the All-Ireland semi-final is their biggest defeat in the championship since a 4–16 to 0–2 defeat by Cork in 1897.
 The All-Ireland final sees Kilkenny face Galway in the championship decider for the first time since 1993. It is a record seventh All-Ireland final in succession for Kilkenny while Galway qualify for the All-Ireland final for the first time since 2005.
 The All-Ireland final goes to a replay for the first time since 1959.
 As a result of Kilkenny's defeat of Galway in the championship decider, Henry Shefflin becomes the only player in championship history to win nine All-Ireland medals on the field of play.

Player facts
Debutantes
The following players made their début in the 2012 championship:

Retirees
The following players played their last game in the 2012 championship:

Awards
Monthly

Managerial changes
The following managerial change took place during the championship.

See also
2012 National Hurling League

References

External links
2012 Fixtures and Results

2012 in hurling